Héctor Daniel Águila Serpa (born 21 July 1979) is a Chilean former footballer who played as a defensive midfielder for clubs in Chile and Mexico.

Playing career
A player from Castro, Chile, in his early years as a professional footballer, Águla took part of Huachipato, Universidad Católica and Ñublense before playing for Malleco Unido in the Chilean Tercera División, standing out as a goalscorer.

After a brief step with Provincial Osorno, and taking part of a national amateur championship with the Castro city team, he joined Deportes Puerto Montt in 2003 thanks to Gino Valentini, becoming a historical player of the club, after leaving them at the end of the 2008 season.

Abroad, he played for Mexican side Tiburones Rojos de Coatzacoalcos in 2008, thanks to his friend Héctor Mancilla, ending his career with Deportes Concepción the next year in the Primera B de Chile.

Coaching career
Águila graduated as a football manager in 2013. He has worked for the Colo-Colo youth system by leading an academy in his city of birth, Castro. He also, has worked in the youth ranks of Deportes Puerto Montt.

At the same time, he has coached the Castro city team in 2013 and at under-15 level in both 2020 and 2021 for the national championships.

Personal life
Due to his origin, he is nicknamed El Chilote.

References

External links
 

1979 births
Living people
People from Castro
Chilean footballers
Chilean expatriate footballers
C.D. Huachipato footballers
Club Deportivo Universidad Católica footballers
Ñublense footballers
Malleco Unido footballers
Provincial Osorno footballers
Puerto Montt footballers
C.D. Veracruz footballers
Deportes Concepción (Chile) footballers
Chilean Primera División players
Tercera División de Chile players
Primera B de Chile players
Ascenso MX players
Chilean expatriate sportspeople in Mexico
Expatriate footballers in Mexico
Association football midfielders
Chilean football managers